Kehshur Asgar Babai (also Romanized as Kehshūr ʿAsgar Bābā'ī) is a village in Kushk Rural District, Abezhdan District, Andika County, Khuzestan Province, Iran. At the 2006 census, its population was 55, in 7 families.

References 

Populated places in Andika County